Larry Robertson is a Canadian Anglican bishop. He is the current Bishop of Yukon. He had previously served in the Diocese of The Arctic for 34 years.

References

Anglican bishops of Yukon
21st-century Anglican Church of Canada bishops
Living people
Year of birth missing (living people)